Giuseppina Martinuzzi (Albona, 14 February 1844 – Albona, 25 November 1925) was an Italian pedagogue, journalist, socialist, and feminist.

Biography

Personal life
She lived a long time in Trieste, where she taught in the poor neighborhoods of the city, helping with the integration of the Slovenians and fighting against narrow nationalistic municipalism. She was a leading light in the Women's Socialist Circle and wrote numerous political tracts for the emancipation of women. In her last prose work, Fra italiani e slavi, she expresses her ideal of pacifism and ethnic integration.

Works

 Manuale mnemonico, Trieste, 1886
 I semprevivi. In memoria de' miei cari ed amati genitori Giovanni ed Antonia Martinuzzi, Rovereto 1896
 Nelle caverne di S. Canziano, Udine, 1897
 Albona. 20 genn. 1599 – 20 genn. 1899, Trieste, 1899
 Libertà e schiavitù, Trieste, 1899
 Patria e socialismo, Trieste, 1899
 Presente e avvenire, Firenze, 1900
 Edmondo De Amicis e la questione sociale, Trieste, 1900
 Ingiustizia, Trieste, 1907
 Nazionalismo morboso e internazionalismo affarista, Trieste, 1911
 Maternità dolorosa, Trieste, 1911
 Invito alla luce, Trieste, 1912
 Ai giovani socialisti, Trieste, 1912
 Amilcare Cipriani, Trieste, 1913.

References

1844 births
1925 deaths
Italian feminists
Italian socialists
Italian socialist feminists